The 1994 Lipton Championships was a tennis tournament played on outdoor hard courts. It was the 10th edition of the Miami Masters and was part of the Super 9 of the 1994 ATP Tour and of Tier I of the 1994 WTA Tour. The tournament was held at the Tennis Center at Crandon Park in Key Biscayne, Florida in the United States from March 11 through March 21, 1994.

Finals

Men's singles

 Pete Sampras defeated  Andre Agassi 5–7, 6–3, 6–3
 It was Sampras' 4th title of the year and the 26th of his career.

Women's singles

 Steffi Graf defeated  Natasha Zvereva 4–6, 6–1, 6–2
 It was Graf's 5th title of the year and the 95th of her career.

Men's doubles

 Jacco Eltingh /  Paul Haarhuis defeated  Mark Knowles /  Jared Palmer 7–6, 7–6
 It was Eltingh's 3rd title of the year and the 17th of his career. It was Haarhuis' 3rd title of the year and the 16th of his career.

Women's doubles

 Gigi Fernández /  Natasha Zvereva defeated  Patty Fendick /  Meredith McGrath 6–3, 6–1
 It was Fernández's 3rd title of the year and the 47th of her career. It was Zvereva's 4th title of the year and the 47th of her career.

See also 
 Agassi–Sampras rivalry

References
 Official website
 ATP Tournament Profile
 WTA Tournament Profile